Abtar (also Romanized as Ābṭar) is a village in Noabad Rural District, Arvandkenar District, Abadan County, Khuzestan Province, Iran. At the 2006 census, its population was 39, in 8 families.

References 

Populated places in Abadan County